George W. Williams was a vaudeville performer and recording artist in the United States. He recorded several songs with Bessie Brown his wife. They were one of the comedy duos on the TOBA circuit.

At a 1924 performance at the Strand Theater in Jacksonville, Florida, they sang inside a prop graphophone.

Discography

"Double Crossin' Daddy"
"She's My Sheba, I'm Her Sheik"
"No Second-Handed Lovin' For Mine"
"If You Hit My Dog I'll Kick Your Cat"
"If Mama Quits Papa, What Will Papa Do?"
"The Gal Ain't Born Who Can Treat Me Like You Do"
"He's Never Gonna Throw Me Down"
"Hoodoo Blues"
"When You Go Huntin', I'm Goin' Fishin'"
"I Can Do What You Do"
"Hard Headed Gal"
"A Woman Gets Tired Of One Man All The Time"
"I'm Goin' Out Tonight And Strut My Stuff"
"I'm Tired Of Begging You To Treat Me Right"
"Mississippi Delta Blues"
"Papa, Don't You Mean Your Mama No Good?"
"Pork Chop Blues"
"It Takes A Brownskin Man To Make A High"
"Yellow Blue"
"Scat! Mr. Sweetback"
"You Need Some Lovin'"
"How Can I Get It (When You Keep On Snatchin' It Back)"
"I Won't Stand No Leavin' Now"
"You Ain't Quittin' Me Without Two Weeks' Notice"
"Chain Gang Blues"
"Satisfied Blues"
"I'm Gonna Kill Myself"
"West Virginia Blues"
"Sweet Mandy"
"That Same Cat"
"I'm Done"
"I Don't Care What You Say"
"Bootlegger's Ball"
"When I Get The Devil In Me"
"What Makes Papa Hate Mama So?"
"You Can't Proposition Me"
"Yodelin' The Blues Away"
"Oh! Dark Gal"
"Bald-Headed Mamma Blues"
"Hit Me But Don't Quit Me"
"Who Calls You Sweet Mama Now"
"Some Baby, My Gal"
"Levee Blues"
"It Ain't A Doggone Thing But The Blues"
"Cheatin' Blues"
"Toodle-Oodle-Ooo"
"Hymn Singing Bill"
"He's Tight Like That"
"Just Too Bad"
George Williams and Bessie Brown Volume I: 1923-1925 compilation album
George Williams and Bessie Brown Volume II: 1925-1930

References

Vaudeville performers